Juan Manuel Carrasco Millones (born 24 December 1976), is a Peruvian lawyer and former Minister of the Interior of Peru.

He served as head of the Special Prosecutor for Organized Crime in Lambayeque.

Minister of the Interior
On 29 July 2021, Cevallos was appointed Minister of the Interior of Peru in the Pedro Castillo government.

References

Living people
1976 births
21st-century Peruvian politicians
Defense ministers of Peru